Kalk or KALK may refer to:

 Kalk (surname)
 Kalk, Cologne, a borough of Cologne, Germany
 Kalk, Poland, a settlement in Kościerzyna County, Pomeranian Voivodeship
 Chemische Fabrik Kalk, a former German chemical company
 USS Kalk (DD-170), a US destroyer during World War I
 Abbreviation for Kalkaska, Michigan
 Kalk, an Afrikaans, Swedish, Dutch and German word meaning limestone
 KALK, an American radio station

See also 
 Calk (disambiguation)
 KALC, an American radio station
 Kalak (disambiguation)